Eufaula High School is a secondary school, grades 9 through 12, in Eufaula, Alabama, United States.  A member of the Alabama High School Athletic Association (AHSAA), it plays in the 6A division for girls and boys athletics.

History
Van Buren High School, eventually renamed for doctor Thomas Vivian McCoo, served Eufaula's African American students. Schools in Eufaula remained segregated by race until around 1970.  After integration began the school stopped sponsoring social events such as proms although unofficial segregated events were still held.  By 1990, students at Eufaula High had begun pressuring school officials to allow  integrated proms. The first one was held on Saturday, May 18, 1991, without incident.

More than half the student body is African American and more than a third white.

Alumni
Eufaula High School has produced three NFL players (Walter Reeves, Courtney Upshaw, and Jerrel Jernigan). Upshaw and Jernigan played in, and won, a Super Bowl in their rookie years. Jernigan is currently an assistant coach at Eufaula High, while Upshaw is still in the NFL as a free agent. EHS has also produced WNBA player (Gwen Jackson). Terran Condrey helped Baylor University reach a national title game in 2012. In 2021, Les Snead was the General Manager for the Los Angeles Rams when they won the Super Bowl 23-20 against the Cincinnati Bengals.

References

Further reading

Public high schools in Alabama
Schools in Barbour County, Alabama